Illaena is a genus of longhorn beetles of the subfamily Lamiinae, containing the following species:

 Illaena albertisi Breuning, 1956
 Illaena dawsoni Breuning, 1970
 Illaena exigua (Gahan, 1893)
 Illaena exilis Erichson, 1842
 Illaena nigrina (Pascoe, 1866)
 Illaena occidentalis Breuning, 1974

References

Desmiphorini